Pieczewo  is a settlement in the administrative district of Gmina Nowy Dwór Gdański, within Nowy Dwór Gdański County, Pomeranian Voivodeship, in northern Poland.

References

Pieczewo